Yugoslav Tennis Association was the governing body of tennis in Yugoslavia.

The association was formed in Zagreb in 1922 and its first president was Croat Hinko Wurth.

Successors 
Tennis Association of Bosnia and Herzegovina
Croatian Tennis Association
Tennis Federation of Serbia

References 

  
Sports governing bodies in Yugoslavia
Tennis organizations
Sports organizations established in 1922
1922 establishments in Croatia